The 1981/82 NTFL season was the 61st season of the Northern Territory Football League (NTFL).

The Wanderers Eagles have won their eighth premiership title while defeating St Marys in the grand final by one point.

Grand Final

References

Northern Territory Football League seasons
NTFL